The 60th Primetime Creative Arts Emmy Awards honored the best in artistic and technical achievement in American prime time television programming from June 1, 2007, until May 31, 2008, as chosen by the Academy of Television Arts & Sciences. The awards were presented on September 13, 2008, at the Nokia Theatre in Los Angeles, California. The ceremony was hosted by Neil Patrick Harris and Sarah Chalke and was broadcast by E! on September 20, preceding the 60th Primetime Emmy Awards on September 21. In total, 79 Creative Arts Emmys were presented across 75 categories.

John Adams won eight Emmys to lead all programs at the ceremony. It was followed by Mad Men with four wins and 30 Rock, the 50th Annual Grammy Awards, and The War with three wins each. John Adams also received the most nominations, with 15 in total. In the overall program fields, winners included The 61st Annual Tony Awards, American Masters, Autism: The Musical, Classical Baby, Eric Clapton Crossroads Guitar Festival Chicago, Kathy Griffin: My Life on the D-List, Mr. Warmth: The Don Rickles Project, New York City Opera: Madama Butterfly, Nick News with Linda Ellerbee, The Simpsons, South Park, This American Life, and White Light/Black Rain, among others. While ABC led all networks with 50 nominations, HBO took home the most awards with 16 Emmys.

Winners and nominees
Winners are listed first, highlighted in boldface, and indicated with a double dagger (‡). Sections are based upon the categories listed in the 2007–2008 Emmy rules and procedures. Area awards and juried awards are denoted next to the category names as applicable. For simplicity, producers who received nominations for program awards have been omitted.

Programs

Performing

Animation

Art Direction

Casting

Choreography

Cinematography

Commercial

Costumes

Directing

Hairstyling

Lighting Direction

Main Title Design

Makeup

Music

Picture Editing

Sound Editing

Sound Mixing

Special Visual Effects

Stunt Coordination

Technical Direction

Writing

Governors Award
The Governors Award was presented to the National Geographic Channel's "Preserve Our Planet" campaign, a "long-term, multi-platform effort to help Americans understand the issues of environmental conservation and global survival".

Nominations and wins by program
For the purposes of the lists below, any wins in juried categories are assumed to have a prior nomination.

Nominations and wins by network

Presenters
The following individuals presented awards at the ceremony:

 Jennifer Beals
 Valerie Bertinelli
 Bryan Cranston
 Jon Cryer
 Alan Cumming
 Cat Deeley
 Lisa Edelstein
 Jenna Fischer
 Seth Green
 Anna Gunn
 Tom Hanks
 Joe Mantegna
 Jack McBrayer
 Cesar Millan
 Masi Oka
 Lee Pace
 James Pickens, Jr.
 Oliver Platt
 Chloë Sevigny
 Sarah Silverman
 Evan Spiridellis
 Gregg Spiridellis

Notes

References

External links
 60th Primetime Creative Arts Emmy Awards at Emmys.com
 
 Academy of Television Arts and Sciences website

060 Creative Arts
2008 in American television
2008 in Los Angeles
2008 awards in the United States
2008 television awards
September 2008 events in the United States